The men's 1 km time trial C4–5 track cycling event at the 2016 Summer Paralympics took place on 9 September. Twenty riders competed.

Results

References

Men's 1 km time trial C4-5